Goddess of Liberty may refer to:

 Libertas the ancient Roman goddess of liberty
 Liberty (personification), the personification of Liberty
 Statue of Liberty (Liberty Enlightening the World), a colossal statue in New York harbor sculpted by Frédéric Auguste Bartholdi, sometimes called the Goddess of Liberty
 Goddess of Liberty (Georgia State Capitol), now known as Miss Freedom, a statue atop the capitol dome
 Goddess of Liberty (Texas State Capitol), a statue by Elijah E. Myers atop the capitol dome
 Goddess of Liberty (Tiananmen Square) or Goddess of Democracy, a statue created during the Tiananmen Square protests of 1989
 Goddess of Liberty, a statue atop the Soldiers and Sailors monument in Allentown, Pennsylvania

See also 

 
 Lady Liberty (disambiguation)
 Liberty (disambiguation)